Champapur is a village in Narkatiaganj Subdivision region West Champaran district in the Indian state of Bihar. The village is15 km away from Narkatiaganj, 36 km from its district West Champaran (also called Bettiah) and 230 km from its state capital city Patna.

Demographics
As of 2011 India census, Champapur had a population of 1587 in 290 households. Males constitute 53% of the population and females 46%. Champapur has an average literacy rate of 47.82%, lower than the national average of 74%: male literacy is 64.16%, and female literacy is 35.83%. In Champapur, 22% of the population is under 6 years of age.

References

Villages in West Champaran district
5th-century BC Jain temples